Styrofoam (Arne Van Petegem, born 4 November 1973) is a Belgian one man glitch electronica project (indietronic) on the independent record label Morr Music.

Discography

Releases

Albums

EPs and singles

Sources

External links

 
 Styrofoam's personal blog and music collection at MOG.com

Living people
1973 births
21st-century Belgian male singers
21st-century Belgian singers
Morr Music artists
Nettwerk Music Group artists